No Doctors was an American rock and roll band based out of California's San Francisco Bay Area. Their music drew from a wide range of styles and traditions, most prominently noise, punk, blues, metal, and jazz. Members included guitarist Elvis S. deMorrow, Chauncey Chaumpers on guitar, Mr. Brians on drums, Mr. Clopez on drums, and CansaFis Foote on saxophone, with vocal duties distributed amongst its members in a socialist-collectivist fashion.

History

Early career
Chauncey Chaumpers, CansaFis Foote, and Elvis deMorrow began creating music together in Minnetonka, Minnesota in 1998. A cast of revolving sidemen were to come in and out of the band throughout their early career. Prior to playing as No Doctors, Foote and Chaumpers had created experimental noise recordings for the purpose of psychic investigation, while deMorrow had distributed cassetteworks under the names of "Peyote Tax Return" and "F*ck Your Yankee Bluejeans," created together with an artist now known solely as "Devilman" (RIP).

Still teenagers, the boys began playing sporadic live shows around Minneapolis-St. Paul, inspired by much of the underground noise scene as documented by local record labels E.F. Tapes, Destijl, Fusetron, and the local fanzine Muckraker.

They were soon approached by CEO Matthew St-Germaine with the idea of assisting with a record label, called Freedom From. Much of their early years as a band were influenced heavily by the diverse and radical roster of artists that was quickly cultivated. The Argentine avant-space trio Reynols was to have an exceptional influence on philosophy when the boys accompanied the band on their first American tour, where they explored Minecxio and the role of the No-Mind.

S/T LP
The year 2000 saw No Doctors moving to Chicago to begin work on their debut album. At this point the band expanded into a consistent sextet, with the additions of Mr Brians on drums, Patrick Fogarty on bass, and W Cłøpŝkí on subtle whispers. Numerous other sidemen appeared as well, including the notorious Kevekev. Several distinct copies of the album were initially circulated, as noted by critic Liz Armstrong of the Chicago Reader. The album's deft integration of Minnesotan völk-noise inflections into rock's idiom curried little favor from elite urban critics, but secured the band's place in the American noise underground.

Hunting Season
No Doctors' second record, Hunting Season, was scheduled to be engineered by David N. Feldman, who handled the first album, but Feldman was under contract with R. Kelly and unavailable (Kelly taunted the group with Feldman's cameo in the video for Ignition (Remix) as the dancing white hipster.) Instead the record was recorded at Tarantula Hill in Baltimore with the assistance of Twig Harper and Carly Ptak (Nautical Almanac), and Chiara Giovando (Black Elf Speaks, Black Coitus Family, Harrias, Motörhead). The album was a move away from the dada influences of the first album toward a greater connection with punk rock and heavy metal. Critics repeatedly compared the work to the Velvet Underground, Pussy Galore, and Royal Trux, and Amir Karim Nezar went so far as to declare "No Doctors are the living incarnations of Satan."

ERP Saints
ERP Saints followed in 2004 as a tribute to the East Rogers Park neighborhood of Chicago. This session saw the band stripped down to a quartet. Critics such as Larry Dolman and Matt Weir praised the effort for its clarity and noted a definitive shift in aesthetics: a turning to the light.

Origin & Tectonics
In the fall of 2004 No Doctors relocated to the Bay Area, where they shared a practice space with friends Deerhoof and Kreamy 'Lectric Santa, frequently played live shows in the Bay area, and embarked on a California-only tour in October–November 2006 entitled "US Out of CA." They also released several tracks through compilations and a 7" entitled "T-Bone (Pts 1 & 2)," and released their third full-length album "Origin & Tectonics" on CD/LP in June 2007. No Doctors officially disbanded during the liquidity crises of late 2008, settling outstanding obligations to creditors and dividing all remaining assets in order to recoup market losses sustained from bundled toxic derivatives. Fis and B started Careerers, Elvis plays as Black Stool, and Chauncey abandoned music, taking a gig in contract security. There is no word on the other drummer.

Martian Clxpæs
The oft-silent Clophez lies at the heart of No Doctors' sound. Understanding the mutable essence of the Clops will unlock the band's signature sound for those who have a reasonable understanding of musical and poetic activities and are willing to study the information with due diligence. Critic Dean Roth summed up his analysis of the phenomenon with his statement, "Cloaps resonates throughout No Doctors' unique idiom like a schwa through the language of the sphinxes."

The character was first presented to the general public through the cover of No Doctors' debut LP, depicted beneath a hooded robe and clutching an enormous pair of drumsticks. Since then similarly garbed individuals have sporadically appeared with No Doctors in concert, generally operating percussive devices of a highly unorthodox nature. These devices have ranged from gigantic rolls of Pionite to glass jars full of water to other bands' amplifiers, often but not always attacked with his signature baseball-bat-sized drumsticks. Beware, he got a new pair.

Occasionally taking the place of Mr. Brians himself, CLPX has more generally appeared alongside the regular drummer in a tandem mode, though his role has been nothing if not inconsistent. Some have charged that the role amounts to little more than the band dressing up an outside business consultant. Others have romanticized the donning of the cloak as a passing of political power or even mystical significance. Regardless, there have been at least four "clopezi" who have chosen to distinguish themselves: "'W' Clopex," "Martin the Moon Doggie," "'Claps' Mulligan", and "Carlito Lopez."

It is generally accepted that the spelling of clxpz must remain inconsistent in order to properly convey the meaning of the term. The term "Clophesgian" is similarly employed to reference a wide number of seemingly incongruent or contradictory ideologies, dependent on context, including but not limited to finance, metaphysics, and aquatic lifestyles.

Rumors of a Clopezian States of America issuing its own currency have NOT been substantiated.

Former members
Patlock Fogarty - Bass (S/T, HUNTING SEASON, FFYOU)
Norway "Skunk" Pedersen - percussion (pre-S/T)
Baron Bonn von Mudski McMots - Drums (pre-Norway "Skunk" Pedersen; post-Spinal Tap)
MastaMillions - trumpet (S/T)
Ab'Gayle - Bass (S/T)
Martine Wendle - percussion (pre-ORIGIN AND TECTONICS)
Kevan "www.kevekev.com" Harris - Bass (Milwaukee, WI: Dillo Day 2003)
Eli "Geometry" Jones - Bass (2008)

Discography
2002: S/T CD/LP Freedom From
2003: HUNTING SEASON CD/LP Go Johnny Go / Cock of the Rock
2004: ERP SAINTS CD No Sides
2004: FF YOU Cassette Freedom From
2005: T-BONE PTS 1 & 2 7" Yik Yak
2007: ORIGIN & TECTONICS CD/LP (no label)
2008: bootleg (unknown)

American experimental rock groups
American art rock groups
Rock music groups from Minnesota